This is a list of flags used in or otherwise associated with Argentina.

National flags

Presidential standards

Military

Argentine Army

Argentine Navy

Argentine National Gendarmerie

Other

Scouts de Argentina

Sporting flags

Vexillology Association flags

First-level administrative divisions

Historical

City flags

Unofficial regional flags

Political flags

Ethnic groups flags

Historical flags

Argentine shipping company

Burgees of Argentina

See also
 Coat of arms of Argentina
 Provinces of Argentina

References

list
Argentina
Flags
National symbols of Argentina